The Essential Miles Davis is a 2-CD compilation album by Miles Davis released by Columbia Legacy on May 15, 2001. It belongs to Sony Music Entertainment's "The Essential" series, not to the series "Essentials", established by WEA International, and was released as part of Sony's Miles 75 Anniversary program. In 2008, The Essential Miles Davis 3.0 was released as a limited edition album featuring a bonus third disc that added five more songs to the original track list.

Track listing

CD1
"Now's the Time" – C. Parker
"Jeru" – G. Mulligan
"Compulsion" – M. Davis
"Tempus Fugit" – B. Powell
"Walkin'" – R. Carpenter
"Round Midnight" – T. Monk - B. Hanighen - C. Williams
"Bye Bye Blackbird" – M. Dixon - R. Henderson
"New Rhumba" – A. Jamal
"Generique" – M. Davis
"Summertime" – G. Gershwin - I. Gershwin - D. Heyward
"So What" – M. Davis
"The Pan Piper" – Gil Evans
"Someday My Prince Will Come" – F.E. Churchill - L. Morey

CD2
"My Funny Valentine (Live)" – R. Rodgers - L. Hart
"E.S.P." – Miles Davis - W. Shorter
"Nefertiti" – W. Shorter
"Petits Machins (Little Stuff)" – Miles Davis - Gil Evans
"Miles Runs the Voodoo Down" – Miles Davis
"Little Church" – H. Pascoal
"Black Satin" – Miles Davis
"Jean Pierre (Live)" – Miles Davis
"Time After Time" – C. Lauper - R. Hyman
"Portia" – M. Miller

CD3 (Limited Edition)
"Stella by Starlight" – V. Young - N. Washington
"Milestones" – M. Davis
"Seven Steps to Heaven" – M. Davis - V. Feldman
"Footprints" – W. Shorter
"In a Silent Way" – J. Zawinul

Personnel

Charts

References

External links 

Miles Davis compilation albums
2001 compilation albums
2001 greatest hits albums